The New Adventures of J. Rufus Wallingford is a 1915 American silent film serial featuring Oliver Hardy.

Cast
 Burr McIntosh as J. Rufus 'Jim Wallingford
 Max Figman as Blackie Daw
 Lolita Robertson as Violet Warden
 Frances White as Fanny Warden
 Edward O'Connor as Onion Jones
 Harry Mainhall as Benzy Falls Jr.
 Allan Murnane as Andre Perigourd
 Oliver Hardy (as O.N. Hardy)
 Harry Robinson
 Dick Bennard
 F.W. Stewart
 Violet Palmer
 Malcolm Head
 Frederic De Belleville as Jim Wallingford
 Joseph Colburn

See also
 List of American films of 1915
 Oliver Hardy filmography

External links

1915 films
1915 short films
1915 comedy films
American silent short films
Silent American comedy films
American black-and-white films
American comedy short films
Films directed by Leopold Wharton
Films directed by Theodore Wharton
1910s American films